José Alfonso Cabrera Escobar is a Guatemalan politician who is currently Minister of Public Health and Social Assistance.

References

Year of birth missing (living people)
Living people
Government ministers of Guatemala